Mollisquama is a genus of pocket sharks in the family Dalatiidae. There are two known species each only known from a single specimen; one found off the coast of Chile and the other found in the Gulf of Mexico.

Species 
There are currently two known species:

 Mollisquama mississippiensis 
 Mollisquama parini

References 

Dalatiidae
Shark genera